Aarons Corner is an unincorporated community in Stokes County, North Carolina, United States, near the Virginia border.  It is named after the Aaron Family who settled the area sometime before the 1760s. The community has Aarons Corner Primitive Baptist Church, and at one time a store and post office that was operated by Frank Smith. Some of the families include Smith, Overby, Collins, Martin, Gunter, Lawson, Dalton, Hughes, Joyce, Campbell, Shelton, Shephard, Tucker, and Rogers. 

Unincorporated communities in Stokes County, North Carolina
Unincorporated communities in North Carolina
Populated places established in the 1760s